Windows 10 October 2018 Update (also known as version 1809 and codenamed "Redstone 5") is the sixth major update to Windows 10 and the fifth in a series of updates under the Redstone codenames. It carries the build number 10.0.17763.

Version history
The first preview was released to Insiders on February 14, 2018. The update was originally made available to public consumers on October 2, 2018, but its rollout was halted on October 6, 2018, due to a serious bug that deletes users' personal files after updating. On October 9, 2018, Microsoft re-released the update to Insiders, stating that all known issues in the update (including file deletion bug) had been identified and fixed. On October 25, 2018, Microsoft confirmed the existence of another bug which overwrites files without any confirmation, when extracting from a ZIP file. The ZIP bug was fixed for Insiders on October 30, 2018, and the public rollout of the update resumed on November 13, 2018.

See also
Windows 10 version history

References

Windows 10
History of Microsoft
Software version histories